The family of Henry Ford is an American family from the U.S. state of Michigan, best known for their control of the Ford Motor Company automobile manufacturer, which was founded by Henry Ford in the early-twentieth century. Henry's grandson William Clay Ford Sr. and his family have controlled the Detroit Lions franchise of the National Football League since late 1963. The Ford family are members of the Episcopal Church.

Although the Ford family's ownership stake in the automaker had declined to less than 50% of the company's equity , the family retained operational control through a special class of stock that was established early in the company's history and retained when the company made its initial public offering in 1956. The family owns all of the company's Class B shares, which are collectively entitled to elect 40% of the company's board of directors, with the remaining 60% elected by the holders of the company's publicly traded common stock.

References

Further reading

External links
 Ford Family Tree
 Henry Ford II Biography on IMDB
 Henry Ford Estate
  The Ford Legacy
 The Ford Family 
 A Family Portrait 

 Anne Ford Johnson Obituary

 
Family trees
Episcopalian families